The Paraplane PSE-2 Osprey is an American powered parachute that was designed and produced by Paraplane International of Medford, New Jersey. Now out of production, when it was available the aircraft was supplied as a kit for amateur construction.

Design and development
It features a Hi-Pro  parachute-style wing, single-place accommodation, tricycle landing gear and a single   Rotax 503 engine.

The aircraft carriage is built from aluminium tubing. In flight steering is accomplished via foot pedals that actuate the canopy brakes, creating roll and yaw. On the ground the aircraft has foot pedal-controlled nosewheel steering. The main landing gear incorporates spring rod suspension.

The manufacturer estimates the construction time from the supplied assembly kit as five hours.

Variants
PSE-1
 Designed by Dan Thompson and only sold to the military.
PSE-SF
Special Forces version of the PSE-2, with 12 delivered for use in Operation Desert Storm.
PPSE-WD
Highly modified version of the PSE-2, made exclusively for Disney World use.
PSE-2
Version for commercial sale, designed by Scott Kelly.

Specifications (PSE-2 Osprey)

References

PSE-2
1990s United States sport aircraft
1990s United States ultralight aircraft
Single-engined pusher aircraft
Powered parachutes